Southend-on-Sea is a city and unitary authority in Essex, England, UK.

Southend-on-Sea may also refer to:

Places
 Southend on Sea Foreshore, Southend-on-Sea, Essex, England, UK
 Southend-on-Sea City Council, Southend-on-Sea, Essex, England, UK
 City of Southend-on-Sea, a district of Essex, England, UK
 Southend-on-Sea (UK Parliament constituency), Essex, England, UK

Other uses
 Southend-on-Sea Athletic Club, Essex, England, UK
 Southend-on-Sea Lifeboat Station, Southend-on-Sea, Essex, England, UK

See also

 Southend-on-Sea Borough Council elections, Southend-on-Sea, Essex, England, UK
 Southend-on-Sea Corporation Tramways, Southend-on-Sea, Essex, England, UK
 
  (disambiguation)
 Southend (disambiguation)
 Sea (disambiguation)